Gurchani, or Gorshani, is a Baloch tribe in the Sindh and Balochistan provinces of Pakistan.

Legend 
Source:

In the 10th century, Soomras ruled the Sindh region with Pattan as their capital. They were deposed by the Sammas. This branch of the Sumras is said to have joined the Baloch. Thus formed Gurchani section is settled at Harrand in the Dera Ghazi Khan District. 

The 19th century text, Tārikh-ī-Murād, recounts the legend. The Sumra ruled region was split up into petty principalities quite independent of and often at war with one another. The chief of Phul Wadda, (now Naushahra or Rahimyar Khan) was one Lakha Phulani, who was famous for his generosity to the Charanas. Lakha gifted some horses to a Charan called Swami. These were stolen at Pattan, where the Charan had halted on his way home, by some Sumra youths. The Charan knowing that the theft was committed with the connivance of the Sumra chief, composed a quatrain which spread far and wide in the country. The lines were:-

The dishonour caused by the theft was said to be so unbearable that these Sumras were either expelled or left Pattan. The Dodai Sumra, expelled from Thatta by his brethren, escaped by swimming his mare across the Indus, and half frozen, reached the hut of Salhe, a Rind Baloch. To revive him Salhe placed him under the blankets with his daughter Mudho, whom he eventually married. Thus, the Dodai Sumra founded the great Dodai tribe of the Baloch, and Gorish, his son, founded the Gorshani or Gurchani, now the principal tribe of Dodai origin. The Mirrani tribe, which for 200 years gave chiefs to Dera Ghazi Khan, was also of Dodai origin. Dodai remains a common name among the Sumras whose dynasty ruled Sindh until it was overthrown by the Sammas.

History 
Historically, conflicts were common among Baloch tribes over the control of land and water resources. Alliances and battles were frequent among Leghari, Khosa, Lund, Marri, Bugti, and other tribes.

It is recorded that during the time of Ahmad Shah Durrani, the Gurchani chiefs were offered the right to collect the government share of the produce (masul) in kind on several villages on the plains and to collect a tax on camels coming into the plains in return for the safety of the Hurrund and Dajil frontier.

In one of the most dramatic frontier encounters of the early British era, the Gurchanis and Tibbi Lund tribes, in January 1867, killed Ghulam Husain and almost three hundred of his men at Hurrund. This alliance was formed by British officer Sandeman among Bugti, Gurchanis and Lund, in Jampur, ahead of the large raid planned by Ghulam Husian into Rajanpur tahsil.

The history of Baloch tribes is captured in the ballads which narrate the conflicts and wars fought by various clans, celebrating the valor of tribal chiefs and heroes who fought over territory, water, and grazing grounds. These ballads indicate their tribal identification with both pastoral and agricultural resources: "Thronging forth like a herd of cattle, . . . the heroes of the Lunds and Gurchanis came together [for battle] as the water of a torrent comes against an embankment."

Baloch tribes including Gurchani were fond of poetry. The popular "Elegy on the Death of Nawab Jamal Khan" was composed by Panju Bangulani (a member of the Lashari clan of the Gurchanis). When Jamal Khan died while returning from the hajj, the assembled chiefs offered a prize for the best elegy which was won by Panju Bangulani.

Clan structure

See also 

 List of Baloch tribes
 Sumra

References 

Baloch tribes
Lists of modern Indo-European tribes and clans
Social groups of Pakistan